Infinite Challenge (abbreviated as ) is a South Korean television entertainment program, distributed and syndicated by MBC, that ran from 2005 to 2018.

As of January 2013, it had the largest market share for its timeslot; with between 13 and 17 percent of Korean television viewers watching Infinite Challenge every Saturday night. making it the most-watched free-to-air television program on Saturday evenings, and the most viewed non-drama program in South Korea every week (excluding special sporting events, since November 2006, with the exception of January 2009, April and May 2010).

"Infinite Challenge" began airing in 2005 and ended with 563 episodes on March 31, 2018. Infinite Challenge was also listed on the longest variety show. Since 2009, it lasts for roughly 75 minutes, excluding ten minutes of advertising. Episodes are also frequently rerun on several Korean cable broadcasting channels. Since February 19, 2011 (episode 237), the program has been aired in high-definition. Infinite Challenge has been called "the nation's variety show" and "Korea's real first variety" for having been successful for over ten years.

In March 2018, it was announced that, following the departure of lead producer Kim Tae-ho, all current members have stepped down from the show, bringing the program to an end.  The last episode was aired on March 31, 2018, but the program continued for 3 more weeks with a recap special looking back at the program over the years.

Contents
Infinite Challenge is recognized as the first "Real-Variety" show in Korean television history. The program is largely unscripted, filmed in almost-secrecy and followed a similar format of challenge-based reality television programs. The challenges are often absurd or impossible to achieve, so the program takes on the satirical comedy aspect of a variety show rather than a standard reality or competition program. In earlier episodes, the show's six hosts and staff would continuously proclaim that, in order to achieve its comedic purposes, the program had to be "3-D": Dirty, Dangerous, and Difficult. It gives people fun to try things that seem impossible.

Recurring  segments
These segments were featured in multiple episodes over the years due to their popularity.
 "Infinite News" – a parody on news broadcast in which most of the reported stories happened to some or all of the cast members. Those stories revolve around their personal life and tend to balance between facts and the comedic side of them.
 "Infinite Company" – an unscripted skit that parodied on the lives of office employees, similar to The Office. Initially, the skit was a reproduction of the late comedian Kim Hyung-gon work, called President, President, Our President, portraying a situational comedy around a board of directors of a company before it was changed to be about a group of employees in a small department.
 "Ha & Su" – an unscripted situational comedy around the petty quarrels between Jeong Jun-ha and Park Myeong-su, where the latter is aggressive and hot-tempered while the former is timid and simple-minded. In 2011, they were awarded a "Best Couple" award for their performance.
 "Jimotmi" – it stands for 지켜주지 못해서 미안해 (jikyeojuji motaeseo mianhae), which means "Sorry I could not look out for you" In this segment, the members play hidden-camera pranks on each other to see how they react to certain contrived situations.
 "Introducing My Ugly Friends Festival" – A segment where the members invited their acquaintances which they considered visually unappealing. Afterwards, the members organize a party where they celebrate with various games.
 "Saturday, Saturday's, I Am A Singer" – Suggested by Park Myeoung-Su and Jeong Jun-ha where the program arranges a stage where old artists were given chances to return and perform their hit songs. Sechs Kies and H.O.T. were able to reunite and came out of retirement through this segment.
 "Please, be..." – a segment which was introduced to instill common principles to all of the members. '"Please, come early"' forces the members to be punctual during filming day as the staff will not inform them when they would film the segment. '"Please, be friendly"', featuring Haha and Jeong Hyeong-don, were created to encourage both members to be more comfortable around each other.
 "Ah-Ha" – a Korean word game in which one member says a word, and the next person must then say that word backwards. Members who failed or made mistakes would be hit over the head. This segment premiered in the 2nd season (Infinite Challenge – The Master of Quiz) and was played occasionally in following seasons.
 "One-flash Telepathy" – after hearing a word which was given from the production booth, each member presented a gesture that would best represent that word. A round is cleared if all six members perform the same gesture and punishments were given when they failed. The original alleged purpose of this segment was to unite the minds of the members; however, they have yet to succeed. Voice narration for this segment was provided by Na Gyeong-eun, an announcer and Yoo Jae-suk's wife.
 Television Advertisements – throughout the episodes, the hosts create some satirical Korean television advertisements.
 Calendar-making Project – the members created a series of unique calendars and donated all profits from these sales to charity. This project has succeeded every seasons.

National events
Some of the segments of Infinite Challenge also grew and become a national event where it also actively involved the audiences as well.
 2008 Host-in-Chief Elections – after a humorous request by Park Myeong-su to have a new leader in 2008, all Infinite Challenge members and staff held a vote for a new 'host-in-chief' on December 31, 2007, at the nation's own natural gas field near Ulsan. Prior to the election, each member created campaign pledges to encourage voters to vote for them. All entertainment managers, coordinators, MBC staff and the members voted at the South gate of the MBC Headquarters and the votes were counted on the morning of New Year's Day. Afterwards, Park Myeong-su was declared the new host-in-chief, but evidence showed him of tampering the voting box. The new host-in-chief was given 3 weeks to prove his leadership skills. However, after poor performances for 3 whole weeks, Park Myeong-su announced at an Infinite Challenge press conference that he would step down and wait for the new election to take place. In the aftermath, Yoo Jae-suk was appointed as interim host-in-chief on February 2, 2008. The second host-in-chief election was held on February 4, 2008, at the MBC Dream Center in Ilsan and Yoo Jae-suk won the majority of the votes and was once again reinstated as the host-in-chief.
 WM7 – the "Wrestling Muhan 7" project is an attempt by the members to perform at a professional wrestling event. From July 2009, the members started training by inviting Sonstar, junior-professional wrestler and the drummer of Cherry Filter, as their coach and Park Myeong-su as their club leader. After numerous injuries, including a concussion suffered by Jeong Hyeong-don, setbacks and delays, the members finally put on a performance in front of a live audience on August 19, 2010, at Jangchung Gymnasium. It was broadcast over 11 episodes and MBC also released a DVD edition of this challenge, featuring several unaired segments, stories and the full uncut performance.
 2014 Decision – the show held another host-in-chief election in 2014 where the show elected a host-in-chief with 10 years tenure. A nationwide election was held, which also promoted the citizen's participation on South Korea's 2014 local elections. Similarly, the members created campaign pledges to attract viewers to vote for them in the preliminary internet polls. The second internet poll was held after the special's first episode was aired. In the aftermath of the second poll, Haha and Jeong Jun-ha decided to support Jeong Hyeong-don while Park Myeong-su forfeited to support Yoo Jae-suk. About 50,000 people, including the members of Infinite Challenge, cast their votes on May 22, 2014, on the polling stations at ten major cities on South Korea (Seoul, Incheon, Daejeon, Daegu, Ulsan, Gwangju, Busan, Jeju, Chuncheon, and Jeonju). Another 34,000 people cast their votes earlier on the preliminary voting on May 17–18, 2014. Internet voting also held at the same time of actual poll for the people who were not able to cast their votes on the polling stations and 363,047 people participated on it. Combining the live polls and the internet votes, Yoo Jae-suk won the election by defeating Noh Hong-chul with 45,310 marginal votes or 8.29% of the combined votes.
 Infinite Challenge Song Festival – started in 2007, the members randomly collaborate with real musicians in order to compete for the "Infinite Challenge Song Festival" that is held every two years.

History
 "Infinite Challenge," which aired its first broadcast on May 6, 2006, is Korea's first real variety program. With the success of the program, other broadcasters have also produced real variety programs. The advantage of Real Variety was to ensure that even a popular celebrity who had been recognized as a special person was no different from an ordinary person.

Season 1

The title of Season 1 was Rash Challenge (무모한 도전). Led by Yoo Jae-suk, six or more Korean entertainers (with Noh Hong-chul and Jeong Hyeong-don as a regular members) tried to complete a 'sporting' mission in an outdoor studio, which was based on a viewer's suggestion submitted through the show's homepage. Some of the absurd challenges included racing in a foot-powered swan-shaped paddle boat against a motor boat, playing a tennis match against Maria Sharapova, appearing live on stage at a public fashion show, and playing football against Thierry Henry. A large part of the humor comes from the fact that the cast is generally not well-suited to the challenges they attempt. This program can be compared to the filmed-in-studio Wetten, dass..? of Germany, as the program mainly focuses on the process and progress of the challenges, rather than focusing on the accomplishment of a mission. This format lasted only from April 23, 2005, to October 22, 2005. Despite having a strong following, its average ratings were very low (roughly 5 percent). Due to its sports-related theme, reruns of Season 1 and sports-related episodes of Season 4 (i.e. WM7) episodes are frequently aired on MBC Sportsplus, MBC's satellite and cable network for sports-casting.

Season 2 and 3

From October 29, 2005, to April 30, 2006, Season 2 was titled Excessive Challenge (무리한 도전). For the first few episodes, the program was fairly similar to the first season. However, because the cast members wanted to redefine their characters, they decided to change the whole program concept, calling it Infinite Challenge - Master of Quiz in the third season. Since then, six hosts (with Yoo Jae-suk as 'host-in-chief') played a Korean-letter game called 'Ah-ha' (see below); competed in their knowledge and mental power; participated in on-line popularity polls about specific themes; and explored other comic features. Although the average ratings were low, the unity and dynamics of the members significantly improved. A panelist from Season 1, Park Myeong-su, came back as a co-host, and Haha and Jeong Jun-ha also became co-hosts of the program.

Season 4

On May 6, 2006, the fourth and final season (format) of the program that now simply known as Infinite Challenge (무한도전), went on air. Special coverage of 2006 World Cup Germany was featured for the entire month of June 2006, along with some 'Ah-ha' specials (with Shinhwa, for example) at the beginning of each episode. However, on July 8, 2006, the program took its memorable first step as the first 'Real-Variety' television program in Korean television history, with the airing of a segment called 'Please, come early': The six members were asked to come to the recording session on time or experience some form of punishment (일찍 와주길 바래, a part of the 'Please, be...' series see below), combining elements of both Reality TV and Variety programming, including comic characters from each of the Infinite Challenge members, see 'hosts'). Thereafter, the program has created challenges with regard to anything related to real life (excluding some critical issues such as religions and sexual preferences), in outdoor studios, with little use of acting or heavily based plotting. Since December 2, 2006, the program has received the highest ratings of prime-time lineups for Saturday evening.

In January 2012, the program took a 6-month hiatus due to a labor strike conducted by MBC's reporters and producers. During this period, new episodes were not produced and MBC, instead, aired reruns of previous episodes. In November 2015, Infinite Challenge arranged special exhibition and expo titled "Infinite Challenge Expo", in KINTEX. The program took a 7-week hiatus from broadcast in early 2017, which Kim Tae-ho, the main PD, signified as a period to normalize the production process which has been shortened considerably where the production team had less time and always rushed to meet the deadline. The PD also reveals that the program still continues their regular shooting schedules while being off the air.

The program took another 10-week hiatus from September 9, 2017, due to a labor strike by MBC's reporters and producers. During the strike, new episodes were not aired and reruns of previous episodes were broadcast. The strike ended on November 13, and Infinite Challenge returned to regular broadcasting on November 25. In March 2018, the program came to an end marked by the departure of Kim Tae-ho, the lead producer, which was followed by the members. However, after the last episode was aired, the program returned for 3 more weeks where it aired recap specials that pays tribute to the achievements of the program called "13 Years of Saturdays".

Hosts

Timeline

Former

Occasional appearances
 There are a number of people who both individually work for this program and irregularly appear with Infinite Challenge members (hosts). They are frequently referred to as 'the 8th member' (제8의 멤버).

Awards and nominations

Guests

International

Korean
Numerous Korean celebrities have appeared on the show due to its popularity. Many of the guests have some relationships with the co-hosts of the show, including:

Actors
 Cha Seung-won
 Cha Tae-hyun
 Gong Hyung-jin
 Bong Tae-gyu
 Choi Ji-woo
 Jo In-sung
 Lee Na-young
 Song Joong-ki
 Jin Goo
 Jang Keun-suk
 Joo Sang-wook
 Kim Min-kyo
 Kim Seul-gi
 Go Kyung-pyo
 Kim Sun-ah
 Yoon Son-ha
 Kim Min-jun
 Kim Su-ro
 Kim Tae-hee
 Kim Soo-hyun
 Ko Chang-seok
 Lee Young-ae
 Kim Hye-sung
 Jung Il-woo
 Han Hye-jin
 Lee Yo-won
 Han Ji-min
 Lee Seo-jin
 Han Sang-jin
 Lee Jong-soo
 Jeon Won-joo
 Jung Si-ah
 Yoon Sang-hyun
 Choi Cheol-ho
 Oh Ji-ho
 Kwon Oh-joong
 Jung Joon-ho
 Jang Seo-hee
 Kim Bum
 Julien Kang
 Lee Tae-sung
 Kim Ji-hoon
 Park Bo-young
 Park Shin-hye
 Park Bo-gum
 So Ji-sub
 Shin Se-kyung
 Lee Dong-wook
 Kim Hee-ae
 Son Ye-jin
 Kim Hye-soo
 Lee Je-hoon
 Jung Woo-sung
 Hwang Jung-min
 Joo Ji-hoon
 Choi Min-yong
 Bae Jung-nam
Comedians, Entertainers
 Ji Sang-ryeol
 Lee Yoon-suk
 Kim Hyun-chul
 Kim Je-dong
 Shin Bong-sun
 Song Eun-i
 Kim Shin-young
 Baek Bo-ram
 Kim Kyung-jin
 Park Hwi-soon
 Ahn Young-mi
 Byun Ki-soo
 Kim Mi-hwa
 Kim Young-chul
 Lee Guk-joo
 Kim Jong-min
 Moon Se-yoon
 Yoo Byung-jae

Musicians
 Lee Jung
 Cool
 Kim Sung-soo
 Yoo Chae-young
 Bae Seul-ki
 Hyukoh
 Girls' Generation
 Jessica
 Sunny
 Seohyun
 Turbo
 Kim Jong-kook
 Kim Jung-nam
 Lee Hyo-ri
 Brown Eyed Girls
 Narsha
 Lee Seung-chul
 Joo Young-hoon
 Lee Soo-young
 B1A4
 Baro
 Shinhwa
 SS501
 Tony An
 Sung Si-kyung
 Jewelry
 Park Jung-ah
 Seo In-young
 Hwangbo
 MC Mong
 Lee Min-woo
 Bbaek Ga
 Wheesung
 Uhm Jung-hwa
 Son Dam-bi
 After School
 Lizzy
 Lee Jung-hyun
 Tiger JK / Yoon Mi-rae
 No Brain
 YB
 Lee Sung-jin
 Son Ho-young
 2PM
 Junho
 Jaebeom
 Kara
 Seungyeon
 Jiyoung
 S.E.S.
 Bada
 Shoo
 Epik High
 Eun Ji-won
 Park Hyun-bin
 K.Will
 MBLAQ
 Lee Joon
 Sangchu
 One Two
 CNBLUE
 Sistar
 Secret
 4minute
 Orange Caramel
 SHINee
 Kangta
 Super Junior
 Donghae
 Siwon
 f(x)
 IU
 GFriend
 Big Bang
 Jung Jae-hyung
 Lee Juck
 Sweet Sorrow
 10cm
 Psy
 Leessang
 Gary
 2AM
 Jinwoon
 Jo Kwon
 Park Bom
 Defconn
 All Lies Band
 Go Young-wook
 BoA
 G-Dragon
 Kiha & the Faces
 Infinite
 Kim C
 ZE:A
 Hyungsik
 Siwan
 Kim Bum-soo
 John Park
 So Chan-whee
 Jo Sung-mo
 Kim Hyun-jung
 Kim Gun-mo
 Cool
 Jinusean
 Park Jin-young
 Zico
 Sechs Kies
 Dok2
 BewhY
 Gaeko
 EXO
 Winner
 Mino
 Jinwoo
 DinDin
 Lee Hi
 Mad Clown
 Kim Jong-wan
 Crush
 H.O.T

Sports/athletes
 Lee Yong-dae / Lee Hyo-jung
 Kim Yeon-ah, international figure skater
 South Korea women's national handball team
 Choi Hyun-mi, WBA Women's Featherweight Champion
 Son Yeon-jae, South Korean rhythmic gymnast
 Lee Sung-yong, Korean Professional Baseball Batter
 Lee Sang-hwa, South Korean long track speed skater
Others
 Ahn Hye-kyung, broadcaster
 Na Kyung-eun, broadcaster, Yoo Jae-Suk's wife
 Choi Moon-soon, then-CEO of MBC
 Ohm Ki-young, then-CEO of MBC
 Lee Sang-bong, fashion designer
 Park Kyung-chu, broadcaster
 Huh Young-man, famed comics artist and writer
 Hong Jin-kyung, model and a CEO of food venture company
 Lee Hye-jung, chef
 Yang Ji-hoon, chef
 Myung Hyun-ji, chef
 Kang Seung-hyun, model
 Choi Dan-bi, lawyer
 Jang Jin-young, lawyer
 Jang Yoon-joo, model (Moderator of 2011 Calendar-making project)
 Bae Hyun-jin, broadcaster

Ratings

The show in popular culture
 During the 12th episode (aired on August 16, 2007) of MBC's Monday-night variety programme 'Jippijiggi'(지피지기), comedian Park Su-hong urged Noh Hong-chul, Jeong Hyeong-don, and Ha Ha (members of Infinite Challenge) to create a new comic-variety program called 'Yuhan Dojeon'(유한도전, 有限挑戰, Finite Challenge). However, this was a joke when he attended this program as a guest.
 MBC Drama, MBC's Drama and Entertainment channel on Skylife and Cable TV, has decided to launch a brand-new comic variety show called Infinite Girls (무한걸스), the female edition of Infinite Challenge. Six Korean entertainers including Song Eun-i, Shin Bong-sun, Kim Shin-young, Hwangbo, Baek Bo-ram and Jung Ga-eun serve as the co-hosts of this program. Previous hosts who have already left the show include Ahn Hye-kyung (안혜경, who is former Haha's girlfriend), Kim Hyun-sook (김현숙), Bin-woo (빈우), Kim Ga-yeon and Jung Shi-ah. It aired on September 23, 2007, as a pilot (special) program for Hangawi holidays. Since October 15, 2007, This format went a regular-scheduled programme at the MBC every1, MBC's Cable and Satellite network for comedy and variety shows, eventually.
 On December 27, 2007, the SERI, a well-known economic research institute of South Korea, picked this program as the 6th most-influential product and service of the year 2007, due to its strong public popularity and its own productive characters.
 Infinite Challenge is often mentioned on other similar programs, when guests asking if the staff of the show in question copied the idea for a segment from Infinite Challenge.
 In the first quarter of 2008, the Global Marketing Department of MBC reported that MBC had attempted to sell the format of Infinite Challenge to a European agency in Sweden. This was the first time in Korean television history that such a deal had been made. However, the contract was not finalized, as there were too many characters on the program for the Swedish company to reproduce. Even so, rights to the show were eventually sold to Air France and Qatar Airways' in-flight broadcast.
 The creators of Infinite Challenge filmed an advertisement about Bibimbap which has been shown in Times Square since November 26, 2010. Due to this involvement, the Ministry for Food, Agriculture, Forestry and Fisheries had been put up a Plaque of Honour, to acknowledge MuDo's dedication.
 In 2011, Infinite Challenge held the West Coast Highway Music Festival. At this festival 7 teams participated and everyone got a trophy.
 The show is also famous for its loyal fans, especially from the youth demographic. Despite the show's hiatus of 22 weeks due to MBC's Union Labor Strike in 2012, the show was able to keep its strong popularity with television audiences. It was acclaimed as "the most favorite program in South Korea" numerous times.
 Members of Infinite Challenge cast (Yoo Jae-suk, Park Myeong-su, Jeong Jun-ha, Jeong Hyeong-don, Noh Hong-chul, Haha, Gil) are featured on "Gentleman" music video by Psy.

International
 On June 30, 2015, the rights to air the show was sold to one of the big channels in China; “CCTV-1” proving Infinite Challenge’s rise in popularity as a Korean Variety Show Program. The Chinese version of the show started airing in China on December 6, 2015.
 Before the export publication rights to China, the program was already popular throughout Asia. People of the world watched this program by YouTube and the highest hit  is 3,202,248 (Infinite Challenge Yeongdong Expressway Song Festival, Hwangtaeji's "Mapsosa".)
 The program went to Japan, China, Thailand, America, Africa, Germany, etc. for filming. Many international celebrities participated in one of the episodes.
 In April 2013, a British TV program called The Greatest Shows on Earth came to Korea to showcase Korean TV, and visited Infinite Challenge on set. The episode aired on Channel 4 on July 8, 2013. While visiting the recording session for Infinite Challenge, presenter Daisy Donovan also went in front of the cameras and guested a sketch segment which was shown on both shows.

Plagiarism
It has been alleged that the show was copied without permission by a Chinese variety program called Go Fighting.

According to production company MBC: "Currently in China, multiple broadcasting and production companies are saying they are personally producing 'Infinite Challenge' or a similar program, causing a disturbance in the market and damaging MBC Contents' image.  From hereon, excepting the broadcasting of 'Infinite Challenge' on CCTV1, we will take firm legal action against any behavior that has nothing to do with MBC while making people confused and misunderstand [that program] as MBC's 'Infinite Challenge."

Notes

References

External links
  

 
2005 South Korean television series debuts
2018 South Korean television series endings
Korean-language television shows
MBC TV original programming
South Korean variety television shows